Artificial Paradise is a 1990 Yugoslav film directed by Karpo Acimovic-Godina. It was screened out of competition at the 1990 Cannes Film Festival.

Cast
 Jürgen Morche as Fritz Lang
 Vlado Novak as Karol Gatnik
 Željko Ivanek as Willy
 Nerine Kidd as Rose Schwartz
 Manca Košir as Gospa iz Budimpeste
 Majda Potokar as Micka

References

External links

1990 films
Yugoslav drama films
Films directed by Karpo Godina
Slovene-language films
Films about film directors and producers
Films about Hollywood, Los Angeles
Films set in Slovenia